Partulina fusoidea is a species of tropical air-breathing land snail, a terrestrial pulmonate gastropod mollusk in the family Achatinellidae. This species is endemic to Hawaii, in the United States.

References 

Partulina
Gastropods described in 1856
Molluscs of Hawaii
Taxonomy articles created by Polbot